Anna Louise Marmont (born 22 May 1967) is a Swedish curler, world champion and Olympic medalist. She received a bronze medal at the 1998 Winter Olympics in Nagano.

In 1989 she was inducted into the Swedish Curling Hall of Fame and in 2020 she and the rest of Team Gustafson were inducted into the World Curling Hall of Fame.

References

External links
 

1967 births
Living people
Swedish female curlers
World curling champions
Olympic curlers of Sweden
Curlers at the 1998 Winter Olympics
Curlers at the 2002 Winter Olympics
Olympic bronze medalists for Sweden
Olympic medalists in curling
Medalists at the 1998 Winter Olympics
Continental Cup of Curling participants
European curling champions